{{Speciesbox
| image = Crataegus aestivalis NRCS-1.jpg
| genus = Crataegus
| display_parents = 2
| parent = Crataegus ser. Aestivales
| species = aestivalis
| authority = (Walter) Torr. & A.Gray
| synonyms = 
C. cerasoides Sarg.
C. fruticosa Sarg.
C. luculenta Sarg.
C. maloides Sarg.
C. monantha Sarg.
Mespilus aestivalis Walter
| synonyms_ref = <ref name=FNA>{{citation |author=Phipps, J.B. |year=2015 |title=Flora of North America North of Mexico |chapter=Crataegus aestivalis" (Walter) Torrey & A. Gray, Fl. N. Amer. 1: 468. 1840 |publisher=Oxford University Press |location=New York, Oxford |editor1=L. Brouillet |editor2=K. Gandhi |editor3=C.L. Howard |editor4=H. Jeude |editor5=R.W. Kiger |editor6=J.B. Phipps |editor7=A.C. Pryor |editor8=H.H. Schmidt |editor9=J.L. Strother |editor10=J.L. Zarucchi |volume=9: Magnoliophyta: Picramniaceae to Rosaceae |chapter-url=http://www.efloras.org/florataxon.aspx?flora_id=1&taxon_id=250100056}}</ref>
}}Crataegus aestivalis, known as the eastern mayhaw, is a shrub or small tree of the southeastern United States that grows in low-lying or wet areas from eastern Alabama to central Florida and Virginia.  It is one of several species of hawthorn with fruits known as "mayhaws", which are harvested for use in making mayhaw jelly, considered a delicacy in many areas of the South. Other species of mayhaws include Crataegus opaca'', the western May Hawthorn, which is native from east Texas to Alabama.

The jelly is a rosy color, with a delicate flavor. It's sometimes commercially available at farm stands or specialty Southern food stores.

References

External links

aestivalis
Flora of the Southeastern United States
Flora without expected TNC conservation status